Kikima is a small town in Kenya. It is in Makueni county administratively. It is near the top of the Mbooni hills. The local community is majorly of Native Kamba who are a Bantu speaking community. The nearest landmarks in the area are Mbooni girls secondary school and Mbooni Sub-County hospital.

Economic Activities 
Being a town found within the Mbooni Hills, Agriculture is the main economic activity in this area. Kikima Market is therefore frequented with fresh vegetables and fruits such as kales, cabbages, green beans and tomatoes among others.

Banks within Kikima Market include Kenya Commercial Bank (KCB) and K-Rep.

The town also has supermarkets, wholesale and retail shops, chemists and other financial institutes.

Education 
The most notable college in Kikima is Mutitu Adventist Teachers' College.

Secondary schools within and near Kikima include Mbooni Boys' High School, Mbooni Girls' High School, Utangwa Girls' Secondary School, Mutitu Adventist Secondary School, Kikima Secondary School, Nzeveni Secondary School and Kyuu secondary school.

There are many primary schools

References 

Populated places in Eastern Province (Kenya)